Stixis scandens is a species of liana in the family Resedaceae and the type species in its genus.  No subspecies are listed in the Catalogue of Life.  It is found in Indo-China; in Vietnam it may be called quã dây leo.

References

External links
 
 Original illustration (plantillustrations.org)

scandens
Flora of Indo-China